David Patrick Rusk (born c. 1940) is an American politician. He served as mayor of Albuquerque, New Mexico, from 1977 to 1981. He is the son of former United States Secretary of State Dean Rusk. Rusk is an alumnus of the University of California, Berkeley.

References

Living people
Mayors of Albuquerque, New Mexico
Place of birth missing (living people)
Year of birth uncertain
New Mexico Democrats
University of California, Berkeley alumni
Year of birth missing (living people)